Tyrone Smith is a Scottish broadcast journalist, television presenter and producer. He is currently the Sports Editor & presenter for the North of Scotland edition of STV News at Six.

Smith's work entails presenting the sports section of the programme – both in studio and on location. He reports regularly on a number of different sports including football, rugby, golf, tennis and cricket.

Smith graduated from the University of Aberdeen with an Honours Degree in Politics and International Relations. He then graduated from the University of Strathclyde with a Postgraduate Diploma in Journalism.

Smith gained extensive journalistic experience with Scot FM in Edinburgh, Aberdeen's Northsound Radio, Q FM, and in student radio before joining Grampian Television in 1998. He became the main Sports Presenter for the stations' North Tonight programme two years later. He still remains in this role on the programme, now known as STV News at Six. Currently employed by the B.B.C.

References

External links

Alumni of the University of Aberdeen
Alumni of the University of Strathclyde
British male journalists
Living people
People from Aberdeen
Scottish journalists
Scottish television presenters
Scottish television producers
STV News newsreaders and journalists
1975 births